The Best of Dolly Parton is a compilation album by American singer-songwriter Dolly Parton. It was released on November 9, 1970, by RCA Victor. The album was produced by Bob Ferguson. It includes some of Parton's early hits, a few non-single album tracks, and two previously unreleased tracks ("Mule Skinner Blues (Blue Yodel No. 8)" and "How Great Thou Art"). The album peaked at number 12 on the Billboard Top Country Albums chart. The single, "Mule Skinner Blues (Blue Yodel No. 8)" peaked at number three on the Billboard Hot Country Songs chart and earned Parton a nomination for Best Female Country Vocal Performance at the 13th Annual Grammy Awards. The album was certified Gold by the RIAA on June 12, 1978, for sales of 500,000 copies.

Recording
Two previously unreleased songs were included on the album. "Mule Skinner Blues (Blue Yodel No. 8)" was the only song recorded at the May 4, 1970 session at RCA Studio B in Nashville. "How Great Thou Art" was recorded on May 12, 1970, during the second of three sessions for what would be Parton's 1971 album The Golden Streets of Glory.

Release and promotion
The album was released November 9, 1970, on LP.

Singles
The album's single, "Mule Skinner Blues (Blue Yodel No. 8)", was released in June 1970 and peaked at number three on the US Billboard Hot Country Songs chart and number 4 in Canada on the RPM Country Singles chart.

Critical reception

The review published in the November 21, 1970 issue of Billboard said, "This LP teams with big hits, including "Mule Skinner Blues", "In the Good Old Days (When Times Were Bad)", and "Just Because I'm a Woman". Every tune is packed with that special emotion only Dolly Parton can render in a song. "Down from Dover" is a real tearjerker."

Cashbox published a review in the November 14, 1970 issue which said, "It becomes difficult to choose the selections for a best hits album for Dolly, because almost everything she's recorded has been a hit! Nevertheless, this new album is just a small sampling of the enormous talent she has. "Mule Skinner Blues", "Down from Dover", "Gypsy, Joe and Me", "In the Ghetto", "Just Because I'm a Woman", "How Great Thou Art," and "Just the Way I Am" are included."

AllMusic gave the album 4.5 out of 5 stars.

Commercial performance
The album peaked at number 12 on the US Billboard Top Country Albums chart.

Accolades
Parton earned her first solo Grammy nomination for "Mule Skinner Blues (Blue Yodel No. 8)". It was nominated for Best Female Country Vocal Performance at the 13th Annual Grammy Awards.

Track listing

Personnel
Adapted from the album liner notes and RCA recording session records.

Joseph Babcock – background vocals
David Briggs – piano
Jerry Carrigan – drums
Anita Carter – background vocals
Fred Carter Jr. – guitar
Pete Drake – steel
Dolores Edgin – background vocals
Bob Ferguson – producer
Lloyd Green – steel
Junior Huskey – bass
James Isbell – drums
Les Leverett – cover photo
Mack Magaha – fiddle
George McCormick – rhythm guitar
Wayne Moss – guitar
Al Pachucki – recording engineer
June Page – background vocals
Dolly Parton – lead vocals
Hargus Robbins – piano
Roy Shockley – recording technician
Bob Simpson – remastering
Jerry Stembridge – guitar
Buck Trent – electric banjo
Bill Vandevort – recording technician
Porter Wagoner – liner notes

Charts

Certifications

References 

1970 greatest hits albums
Dolly Parton compilation albums
Albums produced by Bob Ferguson (music)
RCA Records compilation albums